The Naspers Centre is a  skyscraper in Cape Town, South Africa. At its completion in 1962, it was the tallest building in South Africa (fourth tallest in Africa). An electronic news feed used to be displayed on the exterior of the building which would become visible at night. The building serves as the headquarters of the South African multinational media company Naspers.

See also
Portside Tower

References

Buildings and structures in Cape Town
Skyscrapers in Cape Town
Skyscraper office buildings in South Africa
Office buildings completed in 1962
20th-century architecture in South Africa